Hammers Over the Anvil is a 1993 Australian biographical romantic drama film starring Russell Crowe and directed by Ann Turner, who also co-wrote with Peter Hepworth. The film is based on the novel of the same name by Alan Marshall. The original music score is composed by Not Drowning, Waving.

Plot
Based on the novel of the same name by Alan Marshall, the film is set in the early 1900s in a small town in the Western District of Victoria, centering around a young Alan Marshall and the people in his town. Crippled by polio, Alan tries to make sense of his place in a world where a man's physical prowess gains the admiration of women and the envy of his peers, as demonstrated by the horsebreaker East Driscoll, portrayed by Russell Crowe. Charlotte Rampling also stars as an English lady, Grace McAlister, who has moved to the area with her husband. Complications arise as an attraction develops between East and Grace and young Alan deals with the complexities of growing up.

Cast
 Charlotte Rampling as Grace McAlister
 Russell Crowe as East Driscoll
 Alex Outhred as Alan Marshall
 Frankie J. Holden as "Bushman" Marshall
 Amanda Douge as Nellie Bolster
 Frank Gallacher as Mr. Thomas (a preacher)
 John Lee as Charles McAlister
 Daphne Grey as Mrs. Herbert
 Alethea McGrath as Mrs. Blison
 Wayne Pygram as Snarley Burns

Production
The project had been around for a number of years. The script was originally written by Peter Hepworth then rewritten by Ann Turner.

It is set and filming in South Australia's Red Creek in seven weeks on 11 October and 29 November 1991.

Box office
Hammers Over the Anvil grossed $50,491 at the box office in Australia.

See also
 Cinema of Australia
 Russell Crowe filmography
 South Australian Film Corporation

References

External links
 
Hammers Over the Anvil at the National Film and Sound Archive
Hammers Over the Anvil at Oz Movies

1993 films
1993 independent films
1993 romantic drama films
1990s biographical drama films
1990s coming-of-age drama films
Australian biographical drama films
Australian coming-of-age drama films
Australian independent films
Australian romantic drama films
Coming-of-age romance films
1990s English-language films
Films based on Australian novels
Films set in the 1900s
Films shot in South Australia
1990s Australian films